is a Japanese anime television series. It was produced by Nippon Animation and broadcast for 49 episodes on TV Tokyo from 10 October 1991 to 24 September 1992.

Characters

Main characters
Hikaru Kikkawa

A son of a diplomat, who has lived in many countries since he was a baby. He came to Genoa as an international student at the age of ten. Then he joined San Podesta Junior, but he remained a substitute.
He lost his parents in a plane crash and was about to be taken over by his aunt, but was taken over by former famous player Albert Robson. He started out as a disciple of Robson, emerged as the ace of the street club "Columbus", and eventually became the captain of the multinational team "Jupiter Wings". He is weak at making a fuss, but he likes to fall in love and to dream.
Anna Liegi

As assistant and a resident of Robson Clinic. A female football player, and displays her talent among male players. She does manage to get selected for the Italian women's national team, but failed due to injury during training. She has a masculine but caring character, and is like an elder sister to Hikaru.
Albert Robson

Master of Hikaru. Known as an ace striker of England Leopards in his active days. Born and raised in a rich family in England, he opened a clinic in Genoa after retiring from active duty. His belief is that "without being bound by national borders, people who share their thoughts should gather.", after a compromise with his younger brother Charles Robson, he took over the manager of the Jupiter Wings.
M. Bertini

 A cheerful man who is an acquaintance of Robson. He was originally a player scout and mediator.
Julian Ray

 An international student who came from France. He belongs to San Podesta Junior and an ace striker of this team. Born in a noble family, he believes to play for the honor of his motherland. He sometimes has a sarcastic behavior and initially looked down on Hikaru. He was rejected from the French youth national team and joined Jupiter Wings at the invitation of Hikaru.
Catherine Ray

 Julian's younger sister, Hikaru's girlfriend. She is studying abroad at a ballet school in Genoa, and she is a girl who dreams of prima donna. She believes that "the purpose of play is dream and enjoy", and her elder brother Julian sometimes advises her that "You are too optimistic". Finally, she was invited by the ballet team in Paris to leave from elder brother Julian and boyfriend Hikaru.
Cesare Gatti

Initially, he was the captain of Gloria. He was born and raised in poverty and plebeian, and started playing football to get out of poverty and send money to his family. Therefore, he is short-tempered and despised Hikaru and Julian as carefree rich boys. However, as he played against Hikaru and Julian, he recognized their power.

Teamnates of Columbus
Roberto Concini

The former captain of Columbus, and a genuine Genoese. Among team mates of Columbus, he is not a poor player. But, during his captainship, the condition of Columbus was worst. After Hikaru joined, he surrendered captainship to Hikaru and became Hikaru's most loyal servant.
He has a girlfriend named Sophia at the ballet school. However, he is a womanizer, and often makes fun of Hikaru on love affairs.
Lucas Rondi

 The son of a circus family. He grew up in a family environment where he was forced to move due to entertainment reasons, and spent his infantage as if he had only ball friends. He rebelled against Roberto when he first joined Columbus, but Hikaru accepted his case and gradually became familiar with the team.
Giorgio Fornari

A goalkeeper of Columbus. After losing the selection from the Genoa selection team, he rushed to support Hikaru and others.
Macaroni Giotti

A defender of Columbus. In the late stage, he entered San Podesta Junior to challenge Hikaru.
Antonio Solozzo

Players of San Podesta Junior
Mario Santis

An old member of San Podesta Junior, and a Genoese. One who knows early stage of Julian and Hikaru's bad relationship, he tried to reconcile Julian and Hikaru. After Julian joined to Jupiter Wings, he took on the captain of San Podesta Junior and participated in the Junior Champions Cup.
Renzo Rotta

A striker of San Podesta Junior. In the early stage, he was Julian's regular replacement.
Coloni

A goalkeeper of San Podesta Junior.
Renato

A striker of San Podesta Junior. After Julian entered the Jupiter Wings, he became a replacement. A player raised by Mario, he lightly imitated Julian and Hikaru's special skills.
Carone

 The manager of San Podesta Junior. He later took over as the manager of the selection of Genoa.

Other players
Bruno Moricone

The captain of the street club Margherita where Hikaru first confronted. He has a short tempered personality.
Woltz

 A German goalkeeper. He was recruited by Naples during the quarterfinal of the tournament in Italy.
Yann

A former star of the Netherlands youth team. One of the most short-tempered character of this work, he is fired after decimating his team as he tried to toughen up his teammates. 
Papan

Jupiter Wings
The most pretentious player in Jupiter Wings.

Students of the ballet school 
Sofia Ruggiero

Roberto's girlfriend.
Monica Rossi

 A ballet school student who is most in love with Hikaru.
Lisa Palmioli

A schoolmate of Catherine, Monica and Sophia.

Video game
 Top Striker (22 October 1992, Famicom, published by Namco)

References

External links
 Nippon Animation : the outline of "the Top Striker"
 

1991 anime television series debuts
1992 video games
Association football in anime and manga
Association football video games
Fictional association football players
Football in Genoa
Japan-exclusive video games
Namco games
Nintendo Entertainment System games
Nintendo Entertainment System-only games
Nippon Animation
Sports video games set in Italy
Television shows set in Italy
Video games based on anime and manga
Video games developed in Japan